Balisong may refer to:
 Butterfly knife, also known as a "balisong" or a "Batangas knife" 
 Balisong (film), a Filipino film
 "Balisong" (song), a song by the Filipino music group Rivermaya